Malcolm Judge (1918 – 17 January 1989) was a British cartoonist, best known for his contributions to DC Thomson's range of comics. He was married, had one daughter, and lived in Bishopbriggs near Glasgow.

His early career was spent as a writer and journalist, and in 1948 he began contributing comic strips to the newspapers and magazines at DC Thomson. He contributed his first strip, The Badd Lads to The Beezer in 1960, and Colonel Crackpot's Circus to The Beano the same year. He created several more popular strips including The Numskulls in The Beezer in 1962, Billy Whizz in The Beano in 1964 and Ball Boy in the same comic in 1975. He also drew Square Eyes for The Topper, and Ali's Baba and Baron Von Reichs-Pudding in Sparky before and after its merge with The Topper.

Judge remained an active contributor to DC Thomson until his death at the age of 70 in early 1989. John Dallas took over Ball Boy, and John Geering replaced Judge on The Badd Ladds, while the workload on Billy Whizz was shared by Barrie Appleby and Steve Horrocks until the appointment of long-term successor David Parkins. The Numskulls had already been taken over by Tom Lavery in 1979.

External links
 Comiclopedia entry

1918 births
1989 deaths
British comics artists
The Beano people